Bennett Sneddon (born April 4, 1997) is an American soccer player.

Youth 
Sneddon began playing with the LA Galaxy academy in 2013. Sneddon has also spent time training with clubs such as Bodens BK and West Bromwich Albion.

Senior career 
Sneddon signed with LA Galaxy II on July 20, 2015.

Sneddon made his professional debut as a 105th-minute substitute during extra time against Rochester Rhinos on October 17, 2015 in the USL Cup Final replacing injured Clement Diop.

On April 9, 2018, Sneddon joined NPSL side Orange County FC.

References

External links 
 Galaxy Academy Profile

1997 births
Living people
American soccer players
LA Galaxy II players
Association football goalkeepers
Soccer players from California
USL Championship players
National Premier Soccer League players
People from Calabasas, California